Carson Clark  (born January 20, 1989) is an American male volleyball player. He was part of the United States men's national volleyball team at the 2014 FIVB Volleyball Men's World Championship in Poland. He won two NCAA National Championships (2009, 2012) while studying for a degree in sociology at UC Irvine. and two golds at the Pan American Cup (2010, 2012) making his international debut in 2010 against the Dominican Republic. He played for Montpellier, Olympiacos  and Transfer Bydgoszcz.

Clubs
 Montpellier Volley U.C. (2012–13)
 Transfer Bydgoszcz (2013–14)
 Olympiacos (2014–15)
Black Hawks Hyderabad (2019-)

References

1989 births
Living people
American men's volleyball players
Olympiacos S.C. players
Place of birth missing (living people)
UC Irvine Anteaters men's volleyball players